Eric Nelson is an American choral conductor, clinician and composer.

Education 
Nelson received his training in voice and choral conducting at Houghton College, Westminster Choir College and Indiana University.

Career
Eric Nelson is director of choral studies at Emory University, where he teaches graduate choral conducting and choral literature. He conducts Emory's 40-voice Concert Choir and its 180-voice University Chorus. In 2004, he was the recipient of a "Crystal Apple" award for excellence in teaching at the university. He is also the artistic director of the Atlanta Master Chorale, a 60-voice adult chamber choir specializing in a cappella repertoire.

Nelson has conducted choirs throughout North America and Europe, including performances in Kraków, Berlin, Leipzig, Prague, Moscow, Washington, D.C., Carnegie Hall, Lincoln Center, Spivey Hall, the Piccolo Spoleto Festival, and at both the Southern and National Conventions of the ACDA. His ensembles have been praised for their ability to combine a high level of technical precision with warmth of musical expression.

Nelson has conducted and presented workshops for the American Choral Directors Association, the Music Educator's National Conference, the Association of Lutheran Church Musicians, the Presbyterian Association of Musicians, the American Guild of Organists, Chorister's Guild, Church Music Explosion (at Coral Ridge Presbyterian Church) and for numerous other churches, colleges and universities.

Works 
Nelson is a composer of choral music whose works are published by Colla Voce and Augsburg Fortress.

Colla Voce 
 "Music, When Soft Voices Die" - In memory of Deborah A. Hunter, text by Percy Bysshe Shelly. (SATB with piano accompaniment)

Text

Music, when soft voices die,
Vibrates in the memory;
Odours, when sweet violets sicken,
Live within the sense they quicken.
  
Rose leaves, when the rose is dead,
Are heap'd for the belovèd's bed;
And so thy thoughts, when thou art gone,
Love itself shall slumber on.

Augsburg Fortress
"How Can I Keep from Singing?": (SATB, a cappella, released: February 4, 2002)
"It is Well With My Soul": (SATB, piano accompaniment, released: March 2, 2005)

References

Year of birth missing (living people)
Living people
Westminster Choir College alumni
American choral conductors
American male conductors (music)
Place of birth missing (living people)
Indiana University alumni
Emory University faculty
American male composers
21st-century American composers
Houghton University alumni
21st-century American conductors (music)
21st-century American male musicians